Grazia Zafferani (born 31 December 1972) is a Sammarinese politician and one of the Captains Regent with Alessandro Mancini from 1 April 2020. The joint terms of Zafferani and Mancini expired on 1 October 2020.

Life
Zafferani worked as an entrepreneur in the field of clothing and after that remained in the field of commerce. She is married and is a mother of four daughters. She also became a founding member and the first President of the RETE Movement in 2012 and has served as a member of the Grand and General Council for three consecutive elections since 2013.

She is a granddaughter of Luigi Zafferani, who served as a Captain Regent in 1947 and a niece of Rossano Zafferani, who held the same post in 1987–1988.

References

1972 births
Living people
People from the City of San Marino
21st-century women politicians
Captains Regent of San Marino
Members of the Grand and General Council
Female heads of state
RETE Movement politicians
Sammarinese women in politics